The 2004 AFL draft, concerning player acquisitions in the 2004/05 Australian Football League off-season, consisted of a trade period, a national draft, a pre-season draft, and the elevation of rookies. The AFL draft is the annual draft of talented players by Australian rules football teams that participate in the main competition of that sport, the Australian Football League.

In 2004 there were 78 picks to be drafted between 16 teams in the national draft. Richmond received the first pick in the national draft after finishing on the bottom of the ladder during the 2004 AFL season. Carlton's two-year ban from the first and second rounds of the AFL draft expired in 2004 and they returned to the early part of the draft, with selections 9 and 25. As it had traded away its first and second round draft picks in 2001, effectively the Blues' first and second round draft picks were its first since 2000. They finished the 2004 season 11th with 10 wins and 12 losses, too high to be eligible for a priority draft pick.

Key Dates

Trades
In alphabetical order of new clubs

2004 national draft

2005 pre-season draft

2005 rookie draft

Notes

Rookie elevation
In alphabetical order of professional clubs. This list contains 2004-listed rookies who were elevated in the off-season; it does not detail the rookie draft which took place in the 2004/05 off-season.

References

External links
 Official 2004 AFL Draft list
 2005 Rookie Draft list

AFL Draft
Australian Football League draft
AFL Draft
2000s in Melbourne
Australian rules football in Victoria (Australia)
Sport in Melbourne
Events in Melbourne